Gustavo Pittaluga may refer to:

 Gustavo Pittaluga (doctor) (1876–1956), Italian doctor and biologist
 Gustavo Pittaluga (composer) (1906–1975), Spanish composer